is a Japanese pop singer and actress, associated with Hello! Project and best known as a founding member of the girl band Morning Musume. She has also recorded with the Morning Musume side project band Tanpopo and is currently a solo artist. During her time in the group, she was the tallest member (168 cm), earning her the nickname "Kaorin" & "Kao-tan".
She is currently a member of Dream Morning Musume.

Biography 

Kaori Iida was born in Hokkaidō. She was one of 10 runners-up in a 1997 talent contest for a new Japanese rock idol.  After the contest, musician and producer Tsunku offered Iida and four of the other runners-up (Natsumi Abe, Yuko Nakazawa, Aya Ishiguro, and Asuka Fukuda) the chance to be taken under his wing on one condition: that they sell 50,000 CDs of their song "Ai no Tane" in 5 days. The quintet accomplished that task in four and, thus, in 1997, Morning Musume was born (and their first official single "Morning Coffee" was released in 1998). The group has since been increasingly popular in Japan, has achieved a cult following in the Western world and is infamous for its fluctuation of memberships, with members "graduating" and joining frequently.

In 1998, Tsunku placed Iida into subgroup Tanpopo with Aya Ishiguro and 2nd generation Morning Musume member Mari Yaguchi, and they specialized in singing slower, more mature songs. Together they made four singles and an album. After Ishiguro graduated from Morning Musume and Tanpopo in January 2000, Iida and Yaguchi performed Tanpopo songs as a duet until Tsunku placed 4th generation Morning Musume members Ai Kago and Rika Ishikawa into the subgroup. Tanpopo's style was also given a revamping, with songs being more upbeat and pop-ish, but nonetheless still slower than Morning Musume. In this formation, Tanpopo released 3 more singles, a compilation album, and a compilation DVD.

After Morning Musume's then-leader Yuko Nakazawa graduated in the Spring of 2001, Iida took on the role as the group's leader. Additionally, when Morning Musume "split" into 2 subgroups in 2003—Iida was leader of Morning Musume Otomegumi. She is also known for keeping her hair long throughout her Morning Musume career and also for spacing out frequently.

In July 2002, Tanpopo, along with other Morning Musume subgroups Petitmoni and Minimoni, experienced changes in their membership - partly due to graduating Morning Musume members and partly to showcase the newer members.  As a result, Iida (along with Mari and Ai K.) graduated from Tanpopo.

As with Hello! Project's shuffle groups, Iida was placed in punk-rock Aoiro 7 in 2000, folky festival style 10-nin Matsuri in 2001 and Odoru 11 in 2002, and ska-punk 11Water in 2003. She also participated in the 2004 summer shuffle group H.P. All Stars. In 2005, she participated in the shuffle group Puripuri Pink. She is the only member of Hello! Project to have participated in all the shuffle groups since the tradition started.

Additionally, Iida is pursuing a solo career as an artist and singer. Her solo musical career includes two albums outside of Hello! Project where she sings covers of French, Greek, and Italian songs (in their respective languages). She also has two singles in Japanese, released in advance of her impending graduation from Morning Musume—though still set in a Mediterranean-esque style; many Western fans of Morning Musume and Hello! Project have described the style of Iida's solo material as "Euro-enka". In Morning Musume, Iida mostly sang harmony with a few solo lines. Her signature song in Morning Musume is "Yume no Naka", from the group's first album.  On December 29, 2004, Iida released her third album, this time within Hello! Project and in Japanese.

On January 30, 2005, Iida—the last First Generation member to still be in Morning Musume—graduated from the group to further pursue her solo singing and art careers. Mari Yaguchi took over her role as Morning Musume's leader upon Iida's graduation. Her tenure of over 7 years was the longest of any Morning Musume member, a record Iida would hold until January 2009 when fifth generation members Ai Takahashi and Risa Niigaki broke it.  As of January 2009, she is one of only four members to remain in the group for over 7 years (4th generation member Hitomi Yoshizawa would later achieve this honor just weeks before her graduation in 2007 and 5th generation members Ai Takahashi and Risa Niigaki reached this mark in mid-September 2008). On December 21, 2005, Iida released Plein D'amour: Ai ga Ippai, her fourth album. This album featured songs in Japanese and many European cover songs in their original languages. This was her first album to be released since she graduated from Morning Musume.

In early 2007, Iida was chosen to be a member of  —a unit created to celebrate Morning Musume's 10th anniversary as a group. Morning Musume Tanjō 10nen Kinentai also consists of Natsumi Abe, Maki Goto, Risa Niigaki and Koharu Kusumi. Their first single, was released on January 24, 2007.

After the death of her son, she stated that in his memory, she will continue her career. She returned to the concert stage at the Hello! Project 2009 Winter Elder Club: Thank You for Your Love! series, her first performance in one year and four months. She also performed at the Hello Pro Award '09: Elder Club Sotsugyō Kinen Special concert on February 1, 2009, which celebrated her graduation from Hello! Project along with 21 other Elder Club Members.  Beginning in April 2009, she was to be part of M-Line, the official Morning Musume graduate fan club.  In 2010, it was announced Iida Kaori would join the group "Dream Morning Musume" alongside other former Morning Musume members.

Personal life
On July 6, 2007, Iida's agency announced that she was ten weeks pregnant and would soon marry Kenji, a former member of the disbanded 7 House, a band formed by Tsunku. Iida's wedding took place the next day. Iida began maternity leave after the Morning Musume 10th Year Anniversary Concert Tour: Summer '07 Thank You My Dearest on September 1, 2007.

On February 3, 2008, Iida released a statement to her fan club that on January 22 at 10:30 am, she had given birth to a baby boy. On November 8 of the same year, she announced that her son had died on July 27 from renal failure.

On December 25, 2012, Iida announced via her blog that she was pregnant with her second child. On May 14, 2013, Iida announced on her blog that she had given birth to a healthy boy. On May 2, 2017, she announced her third pregnancy. On September 19, 2017, Iida gave birth to a baby girl.

Discography

Studio albums

Singles

DVD
 2004-02-04 –  with Shoko Aida

Appearances

Dramas
 2001 –

Radio
  (March 2003)
  (April 2, 2005)

Publications

Photobooks

Art/Picture Books
 December 2001 – 
 December 2002 –

Essays
 May 1999/June 2001 –

References and footnotes

External links
 Official up-front create profile
 

 

1981 births
Morning Musume members
Tanpopo members
11Water members
Puripuri Pink members
Hello! Project solo singers
Living people
People from Muroran, Hokkaido
21st-century Japanese women singers
21st-century Japanese singers
Japanese women pop singers
Japanese child singers
Japanese actresses
Japanese idols
Dream Morning Musume members
Musicians from Hokkaido